Estadio Municipal Rumiñahui is a multi-purpose stadium located between the streets Gonzales Suarez and Eloy Alfaro in Sangolquí, Ecuador. 

Used primarily for football, it was the home stadium of Independiente del Valle of the Ecuadorian Serie A until March 2021, when it moved to its new stadium Estadio Banco Guayaquil. The stadium holds 8,000 spectators and was opened on 30 May 1941.

External links
Stadium information

Ruminahui
Buildings and structures in Pichincha Province
C.S.D. Independiente del Valle